Libiopolis was a town in ancient Pontus on the Black Sea coast.

Its site is located near Yuvabolu in Asiatic Turkey.

References

Populated places in ancient Pontus
Former populated places in Turkey
History of Trabzon Province